Female factories were based on British bridewells, prisons and workhouses. They were for women convicts transported to the penal colonies of New South Wales and Van Diemen's Land.

History
An estimated 9,000 convict women were in the 13 female factories, in the colonies of NSW and Van Diemen's Land. This spanned a period of 52 years -1804 to 1856. An estimated 1 in 5 to 1 in 7 Australians are related to these women. The factories were called factories because each was a site of production. The women produced spun wool and flax in all the factories. In the main factories other work was undertaken such as sewing, stocking knitting and straw plaiting. Hard labour included rock breaking and oakum picking.

Women were sent to the female factories while awaiting assignment to a household or while awaiting childbirth or weaning or as punishment.

Locations

 Parramatta female factory, Parramatta, New South Wales (2 factories)
 Newcastle, New South Wales
 Port Macquarie, New South Wales (2 factories)
 Moreton Bay, Queensland
 Five female factories operated in Van Diemen's Land (now Tasmania) during the period of transportation: 
 Cascades Female Factory 
 Ross Female Factory

See also
 Convictism in Australia

References

Further reading
  Gay Hendriksen, Carol Liston and Trudy Cowley, Women Transported — Life in Australia's Convict Female Factories, 2008, Parramatta, Parramatta Heritage Centre

External links
 The Female Factory Online
 https://sites.google.com/site/convictfemalefactories/ 
 ParraGirls.org
 Female Convicts Research Centre
 Cascades Female Factory Historic Site
 https://web.archive.org/web/20061208162522/http://www.hotkey.net.au/~jwilliams4/factory.htm

Convictism in Australia
Defunct prisons in Australia
Defunct women's prisons in Australia